Akwa Ibom State is a state in the South-South geopolitical zone of Nigeria, bordered on the east by Cross River State, on the west by Rivers State and Abia State, and on the south by the Atlantic Ocean. The state takes its name from the Qua Iboe River which bisects the state before flowing into the Bight of Bonny. Akwa Ibom was split from Cross River State in 1987 with its capital Uyo and with 31 local government areas.

Of the 36 states, Akwa Ibom is the 30th largest in area and fifteenth most populous with an estimated population of nearly 5.5 million as of 2016. Geographically, the state is divided between the Central African mangroves in the coastal far south and the Cross–Niger transition forests in the rest of the state. Other important geographical features are the Imo and Cross rivers which flow along Akwa Ibom's eastern and western borders, respectively while the Kwa Ibo River bisects the state before flowing into the Bight of Bonny. In the southeast corner of the state is the Stubb's Creek Forest Reserve, a heavily threatened wildlife reserve that contains declining crocodile, putty-nosed monkey, red-capped mangabey, and Sclater's guenon populations along with potentially extirpated populations of African leopard and Nigeria-Cameroon chimpanzee. Offshore, the state is also biodiverse as there are large fish populations along with various cetacean species including bottlenose dolphins, pantropical spotted dolphins, humpback whales, and killer whales.

Modern-day Akwa Ibom State has been inhabited by various ethnic groups for hundreds of years, primarily the closely related Ibibio, Anaang, and Obolo - Oron peoples in the North-East, North-West, and Southern zones of the state, respectively. In the pre-colonial period, what is now Akwa Ibom State was divided into various city-states like the Ibom Kingdom and Akwa Akpa before the latter become a British protectorate in 1884 as a part of the Oil Rivers Protectorate. In the early 1900s, the British actually gained formal control of the area before incorporating the protectorate (now renamed the Niger Coast Protectorate) into the Southern Nigeria Protectorate which later merged into British Nigeria; after the merger, much of modern-day Akwa Ibom became a centre of anti-colonial resistance during the Women's War and political activism through the Ibibio State Union.

After independence in 1960, the area of now-Akwa Ibom was a part of the post-independence Eastern Region until 1967 when the region was split and the area became part of the South-Eastern State. Less than two months afterwards, the Igbo-majority former Eastern Region attempted to secede as the state of Biafra; in the three-year long Nigerian Civil War, now-Akwa Ibom was hard-fought over in the prelude to the Invasion of Port Harcourt while people from Akwa Ibom were persecuted by Biafran forces as they were mainly non-Igbo. At the war's end and the reunification of Nigeria, the South-Eastern State was reformed until 1976 when it was renamed Cross River State. Eleven years later, Cross River State was divided with western Cross River being broken off to form the new Akwa Ibom State.

Economically, Akwa Ibom State is based around the production of crude oil and natural gas as highest oil-producing state in the country, with Ibeno, Mbo and Eastern Obolo as oil-producing LGAs. Key minor industries involve agriculture as the state has substantial cocoyam, yam, and plantain crops along with fishing and heliciculture. Despite its vast oil revenues, Akwa Ibom has the seventeenth highest Human Development Index in the country in large part due to years of systemic corruption.

History 

The region of the state was created out of Cross River State on September 23, 1987, by the then Military Administration of General Ibrahim Badamosi Babangida.
No central government existed among the people of what is now Akwa Ibom State, prior to the British invasion in 1904. Instead, the Annang, Oron, Efik, Ibono-Obolo and Ibibio were all autonomous groups.

Although several Scottish missionaries arrived in Calabar in 1848, and Ibono in 1887, the British did not firmly establish control of the area until 1904. In that year, the Enyong Division was created encompassing the area of the current state of Akwa Ibom, with headquarters at Ikot Ekpene, an Annang city described by the noted Africanist Kaanan Nair, as the cultural and political capital of Annang and Ibibio.

The creation of Enyong Division for the first time, allowed the numerous ethnic groups to come together. This further provided a venue for the creation of the Ibibio Welfare Union, later renamed Ibibio State Union. This social organization was first organized as a local development and improvement forum for educated persons and groups who were shut out from the colonial administration in 1929. Nonetheless, some historians have wrongly pointed to the union to buttress their argument about the homogeneity of groups in the area. The Obolo Union, comprising Ibono and Andoni stock, was another strong socioeconomic and cultural organization that thrived in the region. The Ibono people have fought wars to maintain their unique identity and territory in the region more than any other group.

When Akwa Ibom state was created in 1987, Uyo was chosen as the state capital to spread development to all regions of the state.

Government 
Politics in Akwa Ibom state are dominated by the three main ethnic groups: the Ibibio, Annang and Oron. Of these three, the Ibibio remain the majority and have held sway in the state since its creation. For the past eight years, between May 29, 2007 - May 28, 2015, the Annang people held sway, since the governor for those eight years, was from Ikot Ekpene senatorial district.

Ministries, Departments and Agencies 
Here are the list of ministries in Akwa Ibom State
Akwa Ibom State Ministry of Justice
Akwa Ibom State Ministry of Agriculture and Food Sufficiency
Akwa Ibom State Ministry of Account and Finance
Akwa Ibom State Ministry of Works
Akwa Ibom State Ministry of Education
Akwa Ibom State Ministry of Environment
Akwa Ibom State Ministry of Transport & Petroleum Resources
Akwa Ibom State Ministry of Local Government and Chieftaincy Affairs
Akwa Ibom State Ministry of Lands, Town Planning & Survey
Akwa Ibom State Ministry of Information & Strategy
Akwa Ibom State Ministry of Health
Akwa Ibom State Ministry of Science & Technology
Akwa Ibom State Ministry of Women Development and Social Development
Akwa Ibom State Ministry of Youth & Sports
Akwa Ibom State Ministry of Administration & Supplies
Akwa Ibom State Ministry of Economic Development Labour and Manpower Planning
Akwa Ibom State Ministry of Investment, Commerce and Industries
Akwa Ibom State Ministry of Culture and Tourism
Akwa Ibom State Bureau of Political/Legislative Affairs and Water Resources
Akwa Ibom State Bureau of Rural Development & Cooperatives
Akwa Ibom State Ministry of Power and Petroleum Resources

Local Government Areas 

Akwa Ibom State consists of thirty-one (31) local government areas. They include:

 Abak
 Eastern Obolo
 Eket
 Esit-Eket
 Essien Udim
 Etim-Ekpo
 Etinan
 Ibeno
 Ibesikpo-Asutan
 Ibiono-Ibom
 Ika
 Ikono
 Ikot Abasi
 Ikot Ekpene
 Ini
 Itu
 Mbo
 Mkpat-Enin
 Nsit-Atai
 Nsit-Ibom
 Nsit-Ubium
 Obot-Akara
 Okobo
 Onna
 Oron
 Oruk Anam
 Ukanafun
 Udung-Uko
 Uruan
 Urue-Offong/Oruko
 Uyo

Demographics

Ethnic groups 
The main ethnic groups of the state include:
Ibibio,
Anaang, Oron and Obolo.

Religion 
The people of Akwa Ibom are predominantly Christians.

Languages 
Like their Efik neighbors of Cross River State, people of Akwa Ibom speak various dialects of the Ibibio-Efik languages, which belong to the Benue–Congo language family, forming part of the Niger–Congo group of languages.

The following table lists languages of Akwa Ibom State, and the local government areas in which they are spoken:

Education 
The Akwa Ibom State Ministry of Education is tasked with monitoring the education sector of the state. The current region of Akwa Ibom State in old Calabar Kingdom, was the first to encounter Western education in Nigeria, with the establishment of Hope Waddell Training Institute, at Calabar in 1895, and the Methodist Boys' High School, Oron  in 1905, as well as other top schools such as the Holy Family College at Abak and Regina Coeli College in Essene.

Some educational institutes in the state are:

Akwa Ibom State Polytechnic Ikot Osurua
Akwa Ibom State University (Oruk Anam LGA and Mkpat Enin LGA)
 Federal Polytechnic, Ukana
Foundation College of Technology Ikot Ekpene
Heritage Polytechnic, Eket
Maritime Academy of Nigeria, Oron
Obong University, Obong Ntak
Ritman University
University of Uyo, Uyo
 
School of Basic Studies, Abak
School of Nursing, Uyo, Eket, Oron, Ikot Ekpene, Etinan
Sure Polytechnic, Ukanafun
Topfaith University, Mkpatak
Trinity Polytechnic, Uyo
Uyo City Polytechnic Nduetong Oku

Notable people 

 
 Obong Victor Attah, former governor of Akwa Ibom State
 Senator Godswill Akpabio, former governor of Akwa Ibom State, former Senate Minority Leader
 Nathaniel Bassey is a Nigerian gospel music minister and RCCG Pastor from Uyo L.G.A, in Akwa ibom state.
 C. A. O Essien  was a retired Nigerian Police Officer/Preacher, who brought the Churches of Christ to Nigeria and West Africa.
 Effiong Dickson Bob
 Ini Edo, Nollywood Actress
 Obong Ufot Ekaette, secretary to the Government of the Federal Republic of Nigeria from 1999 to 2007 under President Olusegun Obasanjo
 Dominic Ekandem first cardinal in English-speaking West Africa. First Nigerian Cardinal to qualify as a candidate to the papacy.
 Senator (Engr.) Chris Ekpenyong Former deputy governor of Akwa Ibom State in the Victor Attah administration and current Nigerian Senator representing Akwa Ibom North-West Senatorial District in the 9th Assembly.
 Engr. Patrick Ekpotu, former Deputy Governor of Akwa Ibom State
 Udom Gabriel Emmanuel, Governor of Akwa Ibom State from May 2015 to date
 Senator Ita Enang, Senior Special Assistant (Niger-Delta) to President Muhammadu Buhari
 Vincent Enyeama, professional footballer (Goalie) and former Super Eagle captain
 Mark Essien, entrepreneur and founder of Hotels.ng
 Chief Donald Etiebet, former Minister of Petroleum
 Nse Ikpe-Etim, Nollywood actress
Eve Esin, Nollywood actress
 Etim Inyang, former Inspector General of the Nigerian Police Force (I.G.P) 1985 to 1986
 Obong Akpan Isemin, elected governor of Akwa Ibom State in Nigeria from January 1992 to November 1993 during the Nigerian Third Republic
 Clement Isong, second governor of the Central Bank of Nigeria; first civilian governor of the former Cross River State
 Emem Isong, multi-award winning filmmaker and CEO of Royal Arts Academy
 Rt. Hon. Onofiok Luke, the 11th Speaker of the Akwa Ibom State House of Assembly and the Pioneer Speaker of the Nigeria Youth Parliament
 Group Capt. Idongesit Nkanga, former military governor of Akwa Ibom State
 Samuel Peter, world heavyweight boxing champion
 Egbert Udo Udoma, from Ikot Abasi, former chief justice of Uganda
 Ime Bishop Umoh, Nollywood actor
 Professor Okon Uya was briefly chairman of the National Electoral Commission of Nigeria (NECON), appointed by President Ibrahim Babangida after the presidential elections of 12 June 1993 had been annulled and his predecessor Humphrey Nwosu dismissed.

Politics
The State government is led by a democratically elected governor who works closely with the state house of assembly. The capital city of the state is Uyo.

Electoral system

The electoral system of each state is selected using a modified two-round system. To be elected in the first round, a candidate must receive the plurality of the vote and over 25% of the vote in at least two -third of the State local government Areas. If no candidate passes threshold, a second round will be held between the top candidate and the next candidate to have received a plurality of votes in the highest number of local government Areas.

See also 
 Akwa Ibom State Ministry of Education
 List Of Government Ministries Of Akwa Ibom State

References 

58. Pastor Nathaniel Bassey, Moses Bliss and Jimmy D Psalmist also made the list of 2022 Owwre.com Top 10 Nigerian Gospel Music Artists from Akwa Ibom State.

59. https://leadership.ng/2023-next-president-govs-must-get-two-thirds-spread-says-inec/

External links 
 akwaibomstate.gov.ng: Official website of the Akwa Ibom State Government

 
States of Nigeria
States and territories established in 1987
1987 establishments in Nigeria